Qarash Qa Tappehsi-ye Olya (also Romanized as Qārāsh Qā Tappehsī-ye ‘Olyā; also known as Qārāsh Qātepsī) is a village in Qeshlaq-e Gharbi Rural District, Aslan Duz District, Parsabad County, Ardabil Province, Iran. At the 2006 census, its population was 135, in 22 families.

References 

Towns and villages in Parsabad County